Henry W. Armstrong (July 22, 1879 – February 28, 1951) was an American boxer, booking agent, producer, singer, pianist, and Tin Pan Alley composer.

Background
His biggest hit was "Sweet Adeline", written in 1903 with Richard H. Gerard. His 1905 sentimental ballad "Nellie Dean" became the signature song of the British music hall singer Gertie Gitana, and subsequently a popular British pub song.

Works
Sweet Adeline (1903)	
Arabella
Dew Drops (1904) instrumental	
Goodbye Eyes of Blue
Follow the crowd on a Sunday (1904)	
I love my wife, but oh you kids
Can't You See I'm Lonely (1905)	
I'd like a girl like you
The Twilight (1905)	
In the golden autumn days sweet Jennie Ray
You're my heart's desire, I love you Nellie Dean (1905)	
Just a line from Jennie
When the Evening Twilight Bids the Day Good-Bye (1906)	
Miss Dinah
Baby Doll (1908)	
Only a Flower by the Wayside
I Could Learn To Love You (1908)	
Rianza Waltzes- instrumental
The Frisco Rag (1909) instrumental	
A Rose of Plymouth Town
Shaky Eyes (1909)	
Tales the moon could tell
Slip your glad rags on and come with me (1910)	*When you have time and money
The Chimes (1912)	
When you've won the only girl you love

References

External links 

 
 
 List of works
 

1879 births
1951 deaths
American male composers
American composers